Asbu (also Romanized as Asbū; also known as Aspā and Asū) is a village in Shahrud Rural District, Shahrud District, Khalkhal County, Ardabil Province, Iran. At the 2006 census, its population was 438, in 131 families.

References

External links 
 Asbu, Ardabil, Iran at Tageo

Towns and villages in Khalkhal County